Zoe (also ZOE, Zoë, Zoé, etc.) can refer to:

People
 Zoe (name), including list of persons and fictional characters with the name
 Zoë of Constantinople, a Byzantine empress
 Zoë (British singer) or Zoë Pollock, British pop singer and songwriter
 Zoë (Austrian singer), Austrian singer, songwriter and actress

Film and television 
 Zoe (film)
 ZOE Broadcasting Network, in the Philippines
 Zoe, Duncan, Jack and Jane, later Zoe..., an American sitcom

Music
 Zoë (album), 2011, by Zoë Badwi
 Zoé (band), a rock band from Mexico
 Zoë Records
 Zoe, an opera by Giorgio Miceli

Songs
 "Zoe" (song), by Paganini Traxx
 "Zoe", by Stereophonics on the 2013 album Graffiti on the Train
 "Zoe", by Paul Kelly from The A – Z Recordings

Places 
 Zoe, Kentucky, a town in Lee County, US
 Zoe, Oklahoma, Le Flore County, US

Technology
 Zoe Motors, an American automobile manufacturer
 Zoé (reactor), the first French atomic reactor
 Zoë (robot), mapping life in the Atacama Desert of Chile
 Renault Zoe, a 2013 electric car

Other uses
 ζωή (zōḗ), the Ancient Greek word for "life"
 ZOE (company), nutrition and Covid symptom study company
 Zo'é, a native tribe in the State of Pará, Brazil
 Zoe (horse), a racehorse
 Zoe (philosophy), a form of life postulated by Giorgio Agamben
 Zinc oxide eugenol, used in dentistry
 Cyclone Zoe (disambiguation), Southern Hemisphere tropical cyclones
 Zoe Theatre, in Pittsfield, Illinois
 Zoe or Zoê, an aeon in some gnostic belief systems

See also 
 Zoey 101, a Nickelodeon TV show
 Zoea, a larval stage of some crustaceans